The Jean Bunoz Sports Hall was an indoor arena that was located in Antibes, France. The arena was primarily used to host basketball games, however it could also be used to host numerous other events, such as: acrobatic gymnastics, boxing, circus performances, competitive dance, concerts, ice skating, martial arts, trampolining, and World Squash. For basketball games, it had a seating capacity of 5,051 people.

History
The Jean Bunoz Sports Hall opened in 1991. It was used as the home venue of the French professional basketball club Olympique Antibes. The arena also serves as one of the venues of the 1999 FIBA EuroBasket. The arena was demolished in 2009.

1991 establishments in France
2009 disestablishments in France
Boxing venues in France
Buildings and structures in Antibes
Defunct basketball venues
Defunct sports venues in France
Demolished buildings and structures in France
Handball venues in France
Indoor arenas in France
Sports venues completed in 1991
Sports venues demolished in 2009
Sports venues in Alpes-Maritimes
Defunct indoor arenas